List of works by or about Steve Coll, American journalist.

Books

Essays and reporting
 
 
 
 
 
 
 
 
 
  John Kiriakou

Contributions on newyorker.com

Notes

Bibliographies by writer
Bibliographies of American writers